Potassium–argon dating, abbreviated K–Ar dating, is a radiometric dating method used in geochronology and archaeology. It is based on measurement of the product of the radioactive decay of an isotope of potassium (K) into argon (Ar). Potassium is a common element found in many materials, such as feldspars, micas, clay minerals, tephra, and evaporites. In these materials, the decay product  is able to escape the liquid (molten) rock, but starts to accumulate when the rock solidifies (recrystallizes). The amount of argon sublimation that occurs is a function of the purity of the sample, the composition of the mother material, and a number of other factors. These factors introduce error limits on the upper and lower bounds of dating, so that the final determination of age is reliant on the environmental factors during formation, melting, and exposure to decreased pressure or open air. Time since recrystallization is calculated by measuring the ratio of the amount of  accumulated to the amount of  remaining. The long half-life of  allows the method to be used to calculate the absolute age of samples older than a few thousand years.

The quickly cooled lavas that make nearly ideal samples for K–Ar dating also preserve a record of the direction and intensity of the local magnetic field as the sample cooled past the Curie temperature of iron. The geomagnetic polarity time scale was calibrated largely using K–Ar dating.

Decay series

Conversion to stable  occurs via electron emission (beta decay) in 89.3% of decay events. Conversion to stable  occurs via electron capture in the remaining 10.7% of decay events.

Argon, being a noble gas, is a minor component of most rock samples of geochronological interest: It does not bind with other atoms in a crystal lattice. But it can escape into the surrounding region when the right conditions are met, such as changes in pressure or temperature.  atoms can diffuse through and escape from molten magma because most crystals have melted and the atoms are no longer trapped. Entrained argon – diffused argon that fails to escape from the magma – may again become trapped in crystals when magma cools to become solid rock again. After the recrystallization of magma, more  will decay and  will again accumulate, along with the entrained argon atoms, trapped in the mineral crystals. Measurement of the quantity of  atoms is used to compute the amount of time that has passed since a rock sample has solidified.

Despite  being the favored daughter nuclide, it is rarely useful in dating because calcium is so common in the crust, with  being the most abundant isotope. Thus, the amount of calcium originally present is not known and can vary enough to confound measurements of the small increases produced by radioactive decay.

Formula
,
where
 t is time elapsed
 t1/2 is the half-life of 
 Kf is the amount of  remaining in the sample
 Arf is the amount of  found in the sample.

In practice, each of these values may be expressed as a proportion of the total potassium present, as only relative, not absolute, quantities are required.

Obtaining the data
The potassium is quantified by flame photometry or atomic absorption spectroscopy.

Rather, the more common  is measured and that quantity is then multiplied by the accepted ratio of / (i.e., 0.0117%/93.2581%, see above).

Assumptions 
According to  the following assumptions must be true for computed dates to be accepted as representing the true age of the rock:

 The parent nuclide, decays at a rate independent of its physical state and is not affected by differences in pressure or temperature. This is a well-founded major assumption, common to all dating methods based on radioactive decay.  Although changes in the electron capture partial decay constant for  possibly may occur at high pressures, theoretical calculations indicate that for pressures experienced within a body the size of the Earth the effects are negligibly small.
Unless some other process is active at the time of cooling, this is a very good assumption for terrestrial samples.
Violations of this assumption are not uncommon. Well-known examples of incorporation of extraneous  include chilled glassy deep-sea basalts that have not completely outgassed preexisting *, and the physical contamination of a magma by inclusion of older xenolitic material. The Ar–Ar dating method was developed to measure the presence of extraneous argon.
 Great care is needed to avoid contamination of samples by absorption of nonradiogenic  from the atmosphere.
 The sample must have remained a closed system since the event being dated. Departures from this assumption are quite common, particularly in areas of complex geological history, but such departures can provide useful information that is of value in elucidating thermal histories. Reliability in the dating of a geological feature is increased by sampling disparate areas which have been subjected to slightly different thermal histories.

Both flame photometry and mass spectrometry are destructive tests, so particular care is needed to ensure that the aliquots used are truly representative of the sample. Ar–Ar dating is a similar technique that compares isotopic ratios from the same portion of the sample to avoid this problem.

Applications

For shorter timescales, it is unlikely that enough  will have had time to accumulate to be accurately measurable. K–Ar dating was instrumental in the development of the geomagnetic polarity time scale. Although it finds the most utility in geological applications, it plays an important role in archaeology. One archeological application has been in bracketing the age of archeological deposits at Olduvai Gorge by dating lava flows above and below the deposits. It has also been indispensable in other early east African sites with a history of volcanic activity such as Hadar, Ethiopia. The K–Ar method continues to have utility in dating clay mineral diagenesis. In 2017, the successful dating of illite formed by weathering was reported. This finding indirectly lead to the dating of the strandflat of Western Norway from where the illite was sampled. Clay minerals are less than 2 μm thick and cannot easily be irradiated for Ar–Ar analysis because Ar recoils from the crystal lattice.

In 2013, the K–Ar method was used by the Mars Curiosity rover to date a rock on the Martian surface, the first time a rock has been dated from its mineral ingredients while situated on another planet.

Notes

References

Further reading

Radiometric dating
Argon
Potassium